Madison Brengle was the defending champion but lost to Caty McNally in the quarterfinals.

McNally won the title, defeating Jessica Pegula in the final, 6–2, 6–4.

Seeds

Draw

Finals

Top half

Bottom half

References

External Links
Main Draw

Dow Tennis Classic - Singles